Nesina may refer to:
 a brand name for Alogliptin, an orally administered anti-diabetic drug
 Nesina (beetle), a ladybird genus in the tribe Sticholotidini